This is an incomplete list of paintings by the French seascape artist Eugène Boudin (1824–1898).

References

Boudin, Eugène